Owensbyville is an extinct town in Heard County, in the U.S. state of Georgia. The GNIS classifies it as a populated place.

History
A post office called Owensbyville was established in 1875, and remained in operation until 1909. John M. Owensby, an early postmaster, gave the community his last name.

References

Geography of Heard County, Georgia
Ghost towns in Georgia (U.S. state)